Calvin Warburton (May 28, 1910 – October 16, 1995) is a former member of the New Hampshire House of Representatives. He represented Raymond as a member of the Libertarian Party, having left the Republican Party in 1991.

Early life and career
Warburton grew up in Lynn, Massachusetts and worked as a military chaplain in World War II, Korea and Germany, then in the National Guard.

Political career
Entering politics at the age of 66, Warburton ran for the U.S. House of Representatives in New Hampshire's 1st congressional district in 1976. In 1991, Warburton unsuccessfully ran for the 1992 Libertarian vice presidential nomination. Warburton sought the party's nomination for Governor of New Hampshire in 1992 and 1994.

See also

 Libertarian Party of New Hampshire

References

Libertarian Party (United States) officeholders
New Hampshire Libertarians
Members of the New Hampshire House of Representatives
People from Rockingham County, New Hampshire
1995 deaths
1910 births
20th-century American politicians